Hypogymnia flavida is a species of foliose lichen in the family Parmeliaceae. It is found in mountainous locations of east Asia, where it grows on the bark and wood of woody plants. It has a relatively large yellowish thallus.

Taxonomy

Hypogymnia flavida was described as a new species in 2001 by lichenologists Bruce McCune and Walter Obermayer. Here it was found growing on a fir tree.

Description
The lichen has a foliose (leafy) pale yellowish-green thallus up to  broad. Soredia, isidia, and lobules are absent from the thallus surface. The ascospores are more or less spherical, measuring 5.5 by 5.0 μm. Pycnidia are also common; the pycnidiospores are cylindrical, with dimensions of 5.5–5.0 long by 0.5–0.8 μm thick. The expected results of chemical spot tests are: cortex P−, C−, KC+ (yellow); medulla P+ (orange-red), K−, C−, KC−. It contains the secondary compounds usnic acid and physodalic acid as major components, and protocetraric acid as a minor component.

Hypogymnia hypotrypa is morphologically and chemically similar to Hypogymnia flavida, but it lacks apothecia and instead has soredia. These two species are one of three fertile/sorediate species pairs in genus Hypogymnia.

Habitat and distribution
Hypogymnia flavida frequently occurs on both the bark and wood of conifers as well as Rhododendron, but it also occurs less frequently on hardwoods, such as oak. In China, it has been recorded from Sichuan, Tibet, and Yunnan. It also occurs in Nepal and Taiwan.

References

flavida
Lichen species
Lichens described in 2001
Lichens of Asia
Taxa named by Bruce McCune